Pseudopsyllo is a genus of Central African orb-weaver spiders containing the single species, Pseudopsyllo scutigera. It was first described by Embrik Strand in 1916, and has only been found in Cameroon.

References

Endemic fauna of Cameroon
Araneidae
Monotypic Araneomorphae genera
Spiders of Africa
Taxa named by Embrik Strand